Sole Survivor is a 2013 CNN Films documentary film by director Ky Dickens.

Cast of survivors
 Bahia Bakari, Yemenia Flight 626
 Cecelia Cichan, Northwest Airlines Flight 255
 George Lamson Jr., Galaxy Airlines Flight 203
 James Polehinke, Comair Flight 5191

See also
 List of sole survivors of airline accidents or incidents

References

External links
 
 
 

2013 films
American documentary films
2013 documentary films
Documentary films about aviation accidents or incidents
Documentary films about death
CNN Films films
2010s English-language films
2010s American films